Baron Darcy of Chiche was a title in the Peerage of England.

History
On 5 April 1551, courtier Sir Thomas Darcy was created Baron Darcy of Chiche so he could serve as Lord Chamberlain of the Household, also becoming a Knight Companion of the Order of the Garter later in the same year.

In 1613, a reversion of the barony was granted to Thomas Savage (later created Viscount Savage and son-in-law of the third baron) on the death of the third baron, with remainder to his male heirs. The third baron was created Viscount Colchester on 5 July 1621 and Earl Rivers on 4 November 1626, and on his death in 1640 the 1551 creation became extinct; the 1613 creation, viscountcy and earldom passed to Savage's son John, 2nd Viscount Savage. The titles became extinct upon the death of the 5th Earl in 1737.

List of titleholders

Barons Darcy of Chiche (1551)
Thomas Darcy, 1st Baron Darcy of Chiche (1506–1558)
John Darcy, 2nd Baron Darcy of Chiche (died 1581), son of the 1st baron
Thomas Darcy, 3rd Baron Darcy of Chiche (1565–1640) (created Viscount Colchester in 1621 and Earl Rivers in 1626)

Barons Darcy of Chiche (1613)
Thomas Savage, 1st Viscount Savage, granted reversion 1613 
John, 2nd Viscount Savage, became Viscount Colchester and Earl Rivers, with 1613 barony, in 1640

See also
Earl Rivers

Footnotes

References

1551 establishments in England
Extinct baronies in the Peerage of England
Noble titles created in 1551